The Disney Springs Resort Area includes ten resorts located around Disney Springs in the Walt Disney World Resort. Two of these are Disney Vacation Club resorts. Seven of these hotels are non-Disney owned.

Disney Resorts
Disney's Port Orleans Resort - Riverside 
Disney's Port Orleans Resort - French Quarter

Vacation Club Villas
Disney's Old Key West Resort
Disney's Saratoga Springs Resort & Spa

Non-Disney Resorts
Hilton Orlando Lake Buena Vista
B Resort & Spa
Wyndham Lake Buena Vista
Drury Plaza Hotel Orlando Lake Buena Vista
Hilton Orlando Buena Vista Palace
Holiday Inn Orlando - Disney Springs Area
DoubleTree Suites by Hilton Orlando - Disney Springs Area

See also
Animal Kingdom Resort Area
Epcot Resort Area
ESPN Wide World of Sports Resort Area
Magic Kingdom Resort Area

External links
Disney's Official Resorts Web Page

Downtown Disney Resort Area
Disney Springs